The Tees Valley Metro was a project to upgrade the Tees Valley Line and sections of the Esk Valley Line and Durham Coast Line to provide a faster and more frequent service across the North of England. In the initial phases the services would have been heavy rail mostly along existing alignments. The later phase would have introduced tram-trains to allow street running. The project was backed by all the local authorities through which the system would have run, the authorities are: Darlington, Hartlepool, Middlesbrough, Redcar & Cleveland and Stockton-On-Tees. Support was also forthcoming from the Department for Transport. The project has been cancelled due to lack of funding. Focus is now on Northern Rail franchise. Of the original "Tees Valley Metro" project, only the construction of a new station at James Cook University Hospital has come to fruition.

Route

The proposed initial routes would have used sections of the Tees Valley, Esk Valley and Durham Coast Lines. There were no current plans as to the interoperability of the continuing services and the new metro services. This would have been considered at the next stage of the process. Several new stations will be built along the routes in two stages. After stage two additional routes using street running may be considered.

Detailed plans

The project was planned to be delivered in two phases, with the first phase split into stages.

Phase 1
Initial work was proposed to be complete by December 2012 and would have included:

 A reduction in journey time by around 5 minutes between Darlington and Saltburn.
 An increase in services from 1–2 to four trains per hour on the Tees Valley Line between Darlington and Saltburn
 Additional platforms at Darlington station on the eastern side of the station to reduce the need for local services to cross the East Coast Main Line.
 Possible new platforms at Middlesbrough.
 Refurbished Class 156 "Sprinters" rolling stock.
 Relocation of Teesside Airport station to serve Durham Tees Valley Airport (Airport in now Teesside International) better.
 A station at Wilton.
 A new station at James Cook University Hospital (opened 2014).
 Improvements to existing stations at Eaglescliffe (occurred), Thornaby (occurred) and Hartlepool.

These improvements were estimated to cost £30 – 40 million.

The second stage of Phase 1 was due to be completed in December 2014.
New stations at Teesside Park, Morton Park and Middlehaven.
New rolling stock, Class 172 Turbostar was put forward.
Refurbishment of other stations on Route 1

The cost of these improvements was estimated at £50 – 60 million.

Phase 2

This phase included improvements to the Esk Valley Line between Nunthorpe and Middlesbrough, and on the Durham Coast Line between Middlesbrough and Hartlepool; new stations at Morton Palms, Middlehaven, The Ings and Nunthorpe Parkway were also proposed, and a further reduction in journey times between Darlington and Stockton.

Planned timeline and shelving

The project had originally received approval from the Interim Regional Transport Board in September 2008, allowing more detailed plans and a public consultation to go ahead. Construction of the first phase was due to commence in 2010 and would have been completed by the end of 2013. Phase one would cost around £80 million and Network Rail had already committed £40 million for signalling improvements. The second phase would cost a further £140 million and would have been in place by 2018.

On 23 July 2009 the project received in-principle funding from the Department for Transport via the Regional Funding Allocation process. Each of the individual components is being treated as an individual project, eligible for fast track funding. Funding was expected for the two new platforms at Darlington, the reopening of platform 3 at Middlesbrough, the relocation of Teesside Airport station to within 350 m of the terminal building, improvements at Eaglescliffe, Thornaby and Hartlepool, including new lifts and footbridges, and the new station at James Cook University Hospital. Reports mentioned a possible new station between Middlesbrough and Redcar Central, proposed as a new station for Wilton International, reopening Grangetown Station or improving and bringing South Bank station fully into use, or relocating Redcar British Steel station As well as the infrastructure improvements the improved rolling stock and increased frequency for trains will be introduced.

This project has been officially shelved by central Government and Tees Valley Unlimited due to lack of and cut funding for the project by Government and lack of interest in the project from Network Rail.

Implemented after shelving
Rail services provided by Northern Rail with some work to try and marginally improve journey times is now the plan going forward.

In 2014, a new railway station at the rear of James Cook University Hospital, was built and opened.

In May 2014, Thornaby Railway Station's ticket office was refurbished and extended. The Government, whilst not ensuring, has requested that new franchise holder from 2016 onwards must attempt to refurbish or replace 35 year old Pacer trains currently in use.

Tees Valley Mayor Rail Plans
Proposals remain the same for rail across the Tees Valley with the Tees Valley Mayor (Ben Houchen) continuing the promise dating back to as early as 2013 of trains twice an hour across the Tees Valley, as of 2021 this has still not happened. This change as its stated will not take place without further funding from Department for Transport and private sector contributions, notably neither currently have plans to do this.
https://teesvalley-ca.gov.uk/transport

Pacer trains have been removed from the network and replaced with still ageing, slightly refurbished rolling stock from elsewhere.

References 

https://teesvalley-ca.gov.uk/wp-content/uploads/2020/10/STP-Main-Report-Design-Digital-pages.pdf

External links 
 Details from the Darlington Transport Forum(PDF)
 Tees Valley Regeneration

Rail transport in North Yorkshire
Proposed public transport in the United Kingdom
Transport in Middlesbrough